LiveTV was a major provider of airline in-flight entertainment systems. Originally a joint venture of Harris Corporation and BE Aerospace (BE Aerospace's interest subsequently sold to Thales Group), it was a wholly owned subsidiary of JetBlue Airways Corporation from its acquisition in 2002 until its sale to Thales in 2014. It had its headquarters in Melbourne, Florida.

The company was one of the "big four" manufacturers of in-flight entertainment systems, along with Panasonic Avionics Corporation, Thales Group, and Rockwell Collins.

History 
Live TV was initially introduced by In-Flight Phone Corporation in 1997. Dimitrios Lalos VP Engineering at In-Flight conceived the idea of Live Satellite broadcasting in 1995 using phased array antennas mounted on the top of the fuselage of the aircraft. Original designs were introduced in 1995 with an Atlanta based microwave company. After In-Flight Phone's bankruptcy, Harris bought the idea from In-Flight Phone for 4.5 million dollars. Live TV bought the business from Harris in 1998. In June 2006, Live TV won a 1 MHz wide block of frequencies in the 800 MHz air-ground telephone auction conducted by the U.S. Federal Communications Commission (FCC).  This license will allow air-ground-air communications to take place. An affiliate of Aircell was the winner of the larger 3 MHz wide block of frequencies. Plans for utilizing these frequencies had not been announced by mid-2007.

On June 9, 2008, JetBlue announced that it will buy Verizon's Airfone (Formerly: GTE Airfone, Formerly: Airfone) service.

Continental Airlines began to add LiveTV to all of its Boeing 737 Next Generation and Boeing 757-300 aircraft beginning in January 2009.

In March 2011, LiveTV announced it would install on-board Wi-Fi connectivity for over 200 United Airlines aircraft, using the ViaSat Ka-band satellite service. United was the second airline to announce the rollout of this high speed internet service, since LiveTV's parent company, JetBlue, entered an MOU with ViaSat in September 2010 in order to equip 160 JetBlue aircraft.

On March 13, 2014, Reuters reported that the division would be sold to Thales for $400 million.
. The sale was completed in June 2014 for $399 Million in cash.

Operations

Headquarters
The LiveTV headquarters was in one  building in the Airport Commercial Park along South Babcock Street in Melbourne, Florida. During that year the company announced plans to move to the Airport Commercial Park. In 2008 the company threatened to move its headquarters to Orlando if it did not receive tax breaks. The City of Melbourne, Brevard County, and the State of Florida gave $164,000 in incentives, so the headquarters moved to a new facility in Melbourne. As of that year the Melbourne headquarters has engineering, finance, marketing and sales personnel.

Other facilities
In addition, LiveTV had a facility on the grounds of Orlando International Airport in Orlando. As of 2008 the facility has a hangar, office space, and a warehouse.

Other offices include:
 Calgary, Alberta
 Denver, Colorado
 Fort Lauderdale, Florida
 Long Beach, California
 New York, New York
 Oakland, California

Products 
Its main product was in aircraft seat-back satellite television service, XM Satellite Radio, and movie programming. The system also offers live flight trackers, for people to see where they are.

Satellite Television Providers 
Depending on the region the airline operates in, different satellite television providers are utilized.

  DirecTV
  Bell Satellite TV
  SKY Brazil

Airlines Used LiveTV Products

Currently 
The following list of airlines currently have the LiveTV System on their Aircraft.

  JetBlue Airways 
  United Airlines
  WestJet
  Azul Brazilian Airlines

Formerly 
The following list of airlines have since removed the LiveTV System from their aircraft.

  Frontier Airlines
  Virgin Australia

References

External links
LiveTV website

Television companies of the United States
Companies based in Brevard County, Florida
Melbourne, Florida
Aviation mass media
2014 mergers and acquisitions
Thales Group divisions and subsidiaries
